The Illinois Journal of Mathematics is a quarterly peer-reviewed scientific journal of mathematics published by Duke University Press on behalf of the University of Illinois. It was established in 1957 by Reinhold Baer, Joseph L. Doob, Abraham Taub, George W. Whitehead, and Oscar Zariski.

The journal published the proof of the four color theorem by Kenneth Appel and Wolfgang Haken, which featured a then-unusual tabulation of computer-generated cases.

Abstracting and indexing
The journal is indexed and abstracted in:
MathSciNet
Scopus
zbMATH

References

External links

Publications established in 1957
Mathematics journals
University of Illinois Urbana-Champaign publications
Quarterly journals
English-language journals
Duke University Press academic journals